Nospitz is a mountain in Liechtenstein in the Rätikon range of the Eastern Alps close to the town of Malbun, with a height of .

References
 

Mountains of Liechtenstein
Mountains of the Alps